Heinrich Burger (31 May 1881 – 27 April 1942) was a German figure skater. He competed in both singles and pairs events. He was Olympic champion and two-time World champion together with Anna Hübler.

Burger and Hübler were the first world champions and the first Olympic champions in pairs figure skating. They never became European champions, because the European championships did not include a pairs competition until 1930. They skated for the club Müchener EV (Munich EV).

Heinrich Burger was also a lawyer in Munich.

Results
(men's singles)

(pairs with Anna Hübler)

References

Sources

 journal Eis- und Rollsport, 49th year, No. 9, 5 January 1939

1881 births
1942 deaths
Sportspeople from Munich
German male single skaters
German male pair skaters
Figure skaters at the 1908 Summer Olympics
Olympic figure skaters of Germany
Olympic gold medalists for Germany
Olympic medalists in figure skating
World Figure Skating Championships medalists
European Figure Skating Championships medalists
Medalists at the 1908 Summer Olympics
19th-century German people
20th-century German people